Henrique Soares da Costa (11 April 1963 – 18 July 2020) was a Brazilian Roman Catholic bishop. He served as bishop of the Diocese of Palmares from 2014 until his death in 2020.

Biography
In 1981, Costa entered the Maceió Seminary and, in 1984, completed a Bachelor's Degree in Philosophy from the Federal University of Alagoas. From 1985 to 1989 he was a novice at the São Bento Monastery, in the city of Rio de Janeiro, and at the Trappist Monastery of Nossa Senhora do Novo Mundo in Curitiba.

He returned to the Seminary of Maceió, in 1990, where he started the Faculty of Theology. The following year, he went to Rome and completed theology at the Pontifical Gregorian University, with a master's degree in Dogmatic Theology.

He was ordained a priest on August 15, 1992. As a priest, he was rector of the Nossa Senhora do Livramento Church in Maceió, from 1994 to 2009 he was a professor of theology at the Maceió Provincial Seminary and in the Theology Course at the Center for Higher Studies in Maceió; he was also a professor at the Franciscan Institute of Theology, in the city of Olinda, and at the Sedes Sapientiae Institute, in Recife.

Costa was a member of the Presbyterian Council of the Archdiocese of Maceió, the Cabido Metropolitano and the Colégio de Consultores; he was also Episcopal Vicar for the laity and coordinator of the Political Formation Commission and responsible for the permanent deacons and for the archdiocesan diaconal school.

On April 1, 2009, he was appointed by Pope Benedict XVI as Auxiliary Bishop of the Archdiocese of Aracaju with the title of Acufida. He was ordained a bishop on June 19, 2009, by Dom Antônio Muniz Fernandes, Archbishop of Maceió.

On March 19, 2014, Pope Francis appointed him bishop of the Diocese of Palmares.

Illness and death
On July 4, 2020, Costa was admitted to the Memorial Hospital São José, in Recife, with a severe respiratory problem from COVID-19, during the COVID-19 pandemic in Brazil. He accepted his situation well, according to his diocese, he was calm, serene and with a deep spirituality. Some time later, on July 18, he died at 57 years of age, victim of complications from the virus. His body, according to information from the Diocese, was taken to his hometown, Palmares. He was the third Brazilian bishop to die because of coronavirus.

Canonization
Days after Soares da Costa's death, Brazilian Catholics have called for an immediate initiation for his canonization process. Currently, he is a probable candidate for sainthood.

References

External links 
 GCatholic 
 Catholic Hierarchy 
  Youtube Official Channel

1963 births
2020 deaths
People from Alagoas
Pontifical Gregorian University alumni
Brazilian YouTubers
21st-century Roman Catholic bishops in Brazil
Deaths from the COVID-19 pandemic in Pernambuco
Roman Catholic bishops of Aracaju
Roman Catholic bishops of Palmares
21st-century venerated Christians